Blues from the Gutter is the first album by blues musician Champion Jack Dupree. In addition to a four-star rating, The Penguin Guide to Blues Recordings awarded the album a “crown”, indicating that the authors considered it an exceptional and essential recording.

Track listing
All tracks composed by Champion Jack Dupree; except where indicated
 "Strollin'" – 4:31
 "T.B. Blues" – 3:38
 "Can't Kick the Habit" – 3:39
 "Evil Woman" – 4:17
 "Nasty Boogie" – 3:06
 "Junker's Blues" – 3:09
 "Bad Blood" – 3:56
 "Goin' Down Slow" (James Burke Oden) – 4:01
 "Frankie and Johnny" (Traditional) – 3:03
 "Stack-O-Lee" (Traditional) – 3:57

Note: the version of "Strollin'" on the CD reissue is a different take to the one on the vinyl album.

Personnel

Performance
Champion Jack Dupree – vocals, piano
Ennis Lowery (aka Larry Dale) – guitar
Wendell Marshall – double bass
Willie Jones – drums
Pete Brown – alto saxophone

Technical
Tom Dowd – recording engineer
Marvin Israel – cover design
Lee Friedlander – photography

References

1959 debut albums
Albums produced by Jerry Wexler
Atco Records albums
Champion Jack Dupree albums